The Chemistry Federation (Fédéchimie) is a trade union representing workers in chemical and related industries in France.

The union was established on 24 January 1948, as the National Federation of the Chemical and Glass Industries.  Its members had formerly belonged to the National Federation of Chemical Industries or the Glass Federation, both affiliated to the General Confederation of Labour, but objected to the influence of the French Communist Party in those unions.  The new union affiliated to Workers' Force (FO).

In 1971, the union's general secretary, Maurice Labi, argued unsuccessfully for the union to merge with the Federation of Chemical Industries, an affiliate of the French Democratic Confederation of Labour.  Defeated, Labi resigned and joined the CFDT with a few hundred supporters.

By 2002, the union claimed 15,000 members.  In 2011, FO Textiles was dissolved, and the majority of its members transferred to the Chemistry Federation.

General Secretaries
1948: Jean Coste
1958: Henri Delaplace
1958: Maurice Labi
1972: Henri Delaplace
1973: François Grandazzi
1997: Michel Decayeux
2006: 
2010s: Hervé Quillet

External links

References

Chemical industry in France
Chemical industry trade unions
Trade unions established in 1948
Trade unions in France